Tuomarila (Finnish) or Domsby (Swedish) is a station on the VR commuter rail network located in Espoo, Finland. 

The station serves the E commuter line from Helsinki to Kauklahti; and the U and night train L lines between Helsinki and Kirkkonummi. It is approximately nineteen kilometres from central Helsinki.

The station has two platforms, and was opened in 1931. The station is unmanned. The old station building is no longer open to the public, as it is in private ownership and as of 2021, used as a private home.

References 

Railway stations in Espoo
Railway stations opened in 1931